Tighdar (also Romanized as Tīghdar and Tīqdār) is a village in Paskuh Rural District, Sedeh District, Qaen County, South Khorasan Province, Iran. At the 2006 census, its population was 981, in 274 families.

References 

Populated places in Qaen County